Adão Nunes Dornelles (April 2, 1923 – August 30, 1991), better known as ’’Adãozinho’’, was a Brazilian footballer who played the striker role for the Brazilian team, he started in three matches. He participated at the 1950 FIFA World Cup, without playing a game. Adãozinho was born in Porto Alegre and played for Internacional, until 1950 when a move to Flamengo was agreed. He died in August 1991, aged 68.

Clubs
 Diário Official F. C.: 1932 – 1942
 Internacional: 1943 – 1951
 Flamengo: 1951 – 1953
 XV de Jaú: 1951 – 1953

Honours
 Campeonato Gaúcho: five times (1944, 1945, 1947, 1948, 1950)
 Campeonato Carioca: 1953.
 FIFA World Cup: Runner-up 1950

References

1923 births
1991 deaths
Footballers from Porto Alegre
Brazilian footballers
Association football forwards
1950 FIFA World Cup players
CR Flamengo footballers
Sport Club Internacional players
Esporte Clube XV de Novembro (Jaú) players
Brazil international footballers